The 1903 NYU Violets football team was an American football team that represented New York University as an independent during the 1903 college football season. In their only year under head coach Robert P. Wilson, the team compiled a 2–5 record.

Schedule

References

NYU
NYU Violets football seasons
NYU Violets football